WQAC (90.9 FM; "The Duck") was a campus radio station located in Alma, Michigan and operated by Alma College. The station primarily played the music of up-and-coming modern rock bands. WQAC also had a large collection of evening student specialty shows. Over its history, these shows covered everything from world music to classic rock to talk shows.

The station signed on March 27, 1993. In 2016, Alma College announced that WQAC would go silent; it would be replaced by "Pirate Media", a digital media service that incorporates photography and video in addition to radio programming. The WQAC license was surrendered on February 12, 2018, and cancelled by the Federal Communications Commission on February 22, 2018.

References

Michiguide.com - WQAC History

External links

QAC
Alma College
Radio stations established in 1993
Radio stations disestablished in 2018
1993 establishments in Michigan
2018 disestablishments in Michigan
Defunct radio stations in the United States
QAC
QAC